Haka is a traditional Māori dance.

Haka can also refer to:
 Haka of Oahu, 7th Alii Aimoku of Oahu
 Haka of the All Blacks, pre-game challenge of the All Blacks rugby team
 Kapa haka, a contemporary Māori performance style
 Ka Mate, a traditional haka in its Māori cultural context
 Haka dance of the Marquesas
 FC Haka, a football (soccer) team in Finland
 Haka, former name of Hakha, a city in the Chin Hills, Burma
 Haka Mukiga, Ugandan ethno-musician

See also
Hakha, Myanmar